British Columbia's Tobacco Damages and Health Care Costs Recovery Act was approved by the Supreme Court of Canada, opening the door for the province to sue cigarette makers, in order to recover the billions spent in inflicted healthcare costs. The act came into force in July 2000.

See also
Imperial Tobacco v. British Columbia

References

British Columbia provincial legislation
Tobacco control
Smoking in Canada